Port Arthur massacre may refer to:
Port Arthur massacre (China), an 1894 event in which Japanese troops killed several thousand Chinese in the Liaodong Peninsula
Port Arthur massacre (Australia), a 1996 shooting spree in Tasmania, resulting in stronger gun control